Erstwhile Susan is a 1919 American silent drama film directed by John S. Robertson, produced and distributed by Realart Pictures. It is based on a 1914 novel Barnabetta by Helen Reimensnyder Martin and later Broadway play Erstwhile Susan by Marian De Forest. Minnie Maddern Fiske starred in the Broadway play in 1916. This film version stars Mary Alden and Constance Binney, then an up-and-coming young actress. This film version, once thought to be lost, survives at the Museum of Modern Art.

Erstwhile Susan was the first film by Realart Films, Adolph Zukor's offshoot affiliate of his Famous Players-Lasky enterprise.

Plot
As described in an adoption in the November 1919 issue of the film magazine Shadowland, Barnabetta (Constance Binney) dreams of furthering her education, but her Mennonite father Jacob (Bradley Barker) disapproves. Jacob later marries Erstwhile Susan (Mary Alden), who has money and changes the family relationships, and sends Barnabetta to college. After graduation, she helps David Jordan (Jere Austin) run for the Senate, who then professes his love for her.

Cast
Constance Binney as Barnabetta Dreary
Jere Austin as David Jordan
Alfred Hickman as Dr. Edgar Barrett
Mary Alden as Erstwhile Susan
Anders Randolf as Barnaby Dreary
Georges Renavent as Emanuel Dreary
Bradley Barker as Jacob Dreary
Leslie Hunt as Albert Buchter
Clare Verdera (unidentified, uncredited role)

Preservation
A copy of the film survives at the Museum of Modern Art. Erstwhile Susan is the only Constance Binney film that survives in a complete form. All of her other work has been lost except for a single reel from First Love (1921).

References

External links

 
 
 Martin, Helen Reimensnyder, Barnabetta, New York: Grosset & Dunlap, 1914 edition illustrated with scenes from the play Erstwhile Susan

American silent feature films
Silent American drama films
1919 films
1919 drama films
Films based on American novels
American films based on plays
Paramount Pictures films
Films directed by John S. Robertson
American black-and-white films
Films based on multiple works
1910s American films